The 1952 Oklahoma A&M Cowboys football team represented Oklahoma Agricultural and Mechanical College (later renamed Oklahoma State University–Stillwater) in the Missouri Valley Conference during the 1952 college football season. In their third season under head coach Jennings B. Whitworth, the Cowboys compiled a 3–7 record (2–2 against conference opponents), finished in third place in the conference, and were outscored by opponents by a combined total of 178 to 146.

On offense, the 1952 team averaged 14.6 points scored, 130.9 rushing yards, and 100.3 passing yards per game.  On defense, the team allowed an average of 17.8 points scored, 171.8 rushing yards and 122.6 passing yards per game. The team's statistical leaders included Ron Bennett with 393 rushing yards, Don Babers with 493 passing yards, and John Weigle with 314 receiving yards.

Center F. A. Dry and tackle Lew Zeigler received first-team All-Missouri Valley Conference honors.

The team played its home games at Lewis Field in Stillwater, Oklahoma.

Schedule

References

Oklahoma AandM
Oklahoma State Cowboys football seasons
Oklahoma AM